Princeton City School District (commonly known as Princeton City Schools) is a city school district in northern Hamilton County, Ohio in the Cincinnati metropolitan area. The school district serves Glendale, Lincoln Heights, and Woodlawn; most of the cities of Sharonville, and Springdale; and parts of Blue Ash, Evendale, and Springfield Township.  In addition the southeast part of Butler County's West Chester Township, the southwest corner of Warren County's Deerfield Township and the northwest corner of Sycamore Township are in the district.

The school district's general offices are located at 3900 Cottingham Drive in Sharonville. The superintendent is Tom Burton.

History
The Princeton City School District was established in 1955, combining Crescentville, Evendale, Sharonville, Glendale, Stewart, Runyan, Woodlawn and Springdale School Districts. Only Sharonville and Glendale had high schools. 3 years after the merger of the 8 districts, a kind donation of land from Marianna Matthews allowed for the building of Princeton High School, the current building that stands on Chester Road in Sharonville. The auditorium was named after the Matthews in honor of their donation. The current middle school, Princeton Community Middle School, was then built. All new elementary schools were built by the end of January 2008 for each city/village and the 2009 bond levy passage allowed for a new high school/middle school to be built on the current site of the middle school. Princeton Community Middle School opened for the 2013–2014 school year.

Schools
High Schools
Princeton High School
 Princeton Innovation Center (Grades 8-12)
Middle Schools
Princeton Community Middle School
Elementary Schools
Evendale Elementary School
Glendale Elementary School
Heritage Hill Elementary School
Lincoln Heights Elementary School
Sharonville Elementary School
Springdale Elementary School
Stewart Elementary School
Woodlawn Elementary School

See also
List of school districts in Ohio

External links

Education in Hamilton County, Ohio
Education in Butler County, Ohio
Education in Warren County, Ohio
School districts in Ohio
School districts established in 1955